Hakan (also Romanized as Ḩakān and Ḩakkān; also known as Hagān) is a village in Darjazin-e Sofla Rural District, Qorveh-e Darjazin District, Razan County, Hamadan Province, Iran. At the 2006 census, its population was 930, in 182 families.

References 

Populated places in Razan County